Małgorzata Elżbieta Tracz (born 8 December 1985 in Bolesławiec) is a Polish politician. She is a co-leader of the Polish Greens political party (since May 2015) and a member of the Sejm since 2019.

References 

Polish politicians
1985 births
Living people
Civic Coalition (Poland)
People from Bolesławiec
Members of the Polish Sejm 2019–2023
Women members of the Sejm of the Republic of Poland